() is the Czech and Slovak word for a municipality (in the Czech Republic, in Slovakia and abroad). The literal meaning of the word is "commune" or "community". It is the smallest administrative unit that is governed by elected representatives. Cities and towns are also municipalities.

Definition
The legal definition (according to the Czech code of law with similar definition in the Slovak code of law) is: "The municipality is a basic territorial self-governing community of citizens; it forms a territorial unit, which is defined by the boundary of the municipality."

Every municipality is composed of one or more cadastral areas. Every municipality is also composed of one or more administrative parts, usually called town parts or villages. A municipality can have its own flag and coat of arms.

Czech Republic

Almost the entire area of the Czech Republic is divided into municipalities, with the only exception being military training areas. The smaller municipalities consist only of one village. A municipality usually has the same name as its most populated settlement, which usually contains the municipal office. However there are several exceptions, for example municipalities created by mergers of formerly separate municipalities (such as Brandýs nad Labem-Stará Boleslav or Orlické Podhůří).

A municipality can obtain the title of a city, town or market town. While all of these are municipalities from the point of view of the law, they are usually referred to by their titles and not as municipalities. Municipalities without any other status are just called municipalities. Statutory cities can have self-governing subdivisions, so-called city parts or city districts, which are somewhat similar to municipalities in that they have their own town halls and local government. Town and market town are above all ceremonial labels bestowed on municipalities with notable population, history and regional significance.

A special type of municipality is the capital Prague, which has simultaneously the status of a municipality and a region, and which is treated by special law.

The law makes it possible for municipalities which were stripped of town status during the Communist period to retain that status automatically. For any other municipality to gain town status, it must have population over 3,000 and must pass an assessment by the chairman of the parliament. For market town status, population is not a condition. The newest Czech town is Miličín, which obtained the status in 2022.

Some municipalities have extended competencies of delegated state administration for the territory of the municipality and for surrounding municipalities.

Statistics

The smallest municipalities by area are Závist (0.42 km2) and Strukov (0.53 km2). The biggest are the cities of Prague (496.21 km2), Brno (230.18 km2) and Ostrava (214.23 km2), and the town of Ralsko (170.23 km2, including a former military area, with only about 2,000 inhabitants).

List of municipalities
List of municipalities in the Czech Republic: A – I
List of municipalities in the Czech Republic: J – M
List of municipalities in the Czech Republic: N – Ř
List of municipalities in the Czech Republic: S – Ž

Slovakia
As of 2020, there are 2,890 municipalities in Slovakia, with 141 of them being a city or a town.

After meeting certain conditions such as population over 5,000, being well accessible, having cultural or economical significance and having an urban style of settlement, a municipality can be declared a town.

References

External links
List of municipalities in the Czech Republic and Slovakia

See also
 okres
 opština
 municipality
 List of cities in the Czech Republic
 List of municipalities in Slovakia

Subdivisions of the Czech Republic
Subdivisions of Slovakia
Geography of the Czech Republic
Geography of Slovakia
.
Populated places in the Czech Republic
Populated places in Slovakia
Czech words and phrases
Slovak words and phrases
LAU statistical regions of the European Union